Marilyn (Marylin) Duke (née Manfrey Lecta Duke; October 3, 1916 Jackson, Georgia – August 7, 1995 Clayton County, Georgia), was an American singer from the swing era of the mid to late 1930s and early 1940s.  She began as a soloist in 1933 on radio in Atlanta, then, beginning 1936, was carried on syndicated and network radio from New York City.  In the first half of the 1940s, Duke traveled and recorded as a featured singer with big bands, notably with Vaughn Monroe.  She distinguished herself as a rhythm singer – that is, a singer who swings. And, while with the Monroe Orchestra, she was acclaimed for having an engaging personality.  Duke was a tall brunette, and, according to journalists, attractive. As for her hair color, Duke was a blonde when she re-joined Monroe's band in 1944.  After her career with big bands – after 1945 – and into the late 1960s, she performed on-and-off as a nightclub pianist-singer in the metropolitan areas of Boston, New York City, and Newport, Rhode Island.  Her recorded hits with Vaughn Monroe include "There'll Be Some Changes Made" and "The Trolley Song" — the latter being a late-1944, post-Petrillo-ban, rush-to-market, swing band vocal duet with Monroe.

Career highlights

Growing up
Marilyn Duke learned to sing in a choir at her church, likely the Macedonia Baptist Church in Jackson, Georgia, a suburb of Atlanta.  Though, according to a 1995 interview (the year she died) in the Atlanta Constitution, at an early age, she preferred the gospel music of a nearby black church.

Atlanta radio career
In 1933, under the product brand pseudonym of "Miss Seiberling," Duke performed on broadcast radio WGST, Wednesdays, 7:15 pm.  The radio name was that of the Seiberling Rubber Company, a national tire manufacturer distributed by the Brooks-Shatterly Company, Inc., of Atlanta. In 1934, Duke, under her birth name, Manfrey Duke, sang regularly on WSB radio in Atlanta.

New York radio career
After winning a radio audition contest around 1934, Duke headed to New York City, where, from December 30, 1934, to 1936 (and later), she sang regularly on NBC radio and the Mutual Broadcasting Company.  She was billed as a blues singer and contralto.  Her radio broadcasts included performances with the orchestras of Leon Brusiloff (1898–1973) and his brother Nathan Brusiloff (1904–1951) and Paul Whiteman. In 1935, her broadcast performances were sometimes with The Charioteers, a male choral quartet.  Beginning December 30, 1934, Duke sang on WOR two or three times a week – typically Tuesdays, Thursdays, and Saturdays at 5:15 pm.  She sang 15-minute segments, usually.  The WOR broadcasts were carried on the Mutual Network.

Early dance orchestra career
From Mid to late-1930s, Duke, as vocalist, was the star attraction for Manny Gates (né Emanuel Getzholtz; 1894–1957) Orchestra in Miami She joined Jolly Coburn's (né Frank Harry Coburn; 1900–1964) Orchestra, a society band, around July 1937 after playing a piano stint at a Boston nightclub.  Duke also sang with the Shep Fields Orchestra in 1937 (in Philadelphia).

Joined Vaughn Monroe's Orchestra in 1940
On New Year's Eve 1940—at age twenty-four— after the death of her father—Duke debuted with the Vaughn Monroe Orchestra at the Statler Hotel Boston, eight months after Monroe founded the orchestra. Her father died January 8, 1940, of injuries as a pedestrian struck by a truck. Monroe formed his orchestra April 1940 in Miami at the urging and sponsorship of band agent Willard Alexander (1908–1984) and New England-based band leader Jack Marshard (né Jacob Marshard; 1910–1948), who saw an opportunity when offered two simultaneous bookings. Marshard became his manager.  Marylin Duke was Monroe's first female vocalist. She had been working as a pianist-singer at a Boston nightclub; but because an infected finger interrupted her playing, she auditioned for Vaughn Monroe and was promptly signed. Her notoriety rose rapidly during her tenure with Vaughn Monroe and his Orchestra as a featured singer.

Departure from Vaughn Monroe's Orchestra in 1943
She left the Monroe Orchestra  around June 1943 to join the WAAC, but instead, continued performing, which included a two-month stint with Tommy Dorsey. That same year (1943), Duke also sang with Will Osborne and His Orchestra.  Filling the void, Monroe hired Phyllis Lynne July 31, 1943, in Los Angeles, to replace Duke. Monroe gave Lynne her East Coast debut on September 14, 1943, in New York City at the Paramount.

Rejoined Vaughn Monroe's Orchestra in 1944

Around June 1944, Duke began a 10-week solo engagement at the Frolic Club (aka, the Frolic Theatre Restaurant), in Revere, Massachusetts, at 155 Revere Beach Boulevard. But, apparently before finishing, she was back with Vaughn Monroe by mid-July 1944, replacing Del Parker. In September 1944, she married Peter O'Brien, a Boston amusement park owner.

She then permanently left the orchestra around January 1945. Yet, on April 14, 1945, Vaughn Monroe and His Orchestra featured Duke, with Bobby Ricky, in Dayton, Ohio, at the Lakeside Park Ballroom.

A large part of Vaughn Monroe's repertoire featured the singing of Monroe, himself, as well as Marilyn Duke, Ziggy Talent, The Murphy Sisters, and The Moonmaids.

On and off solo career

In December 1945, she was performing at the Music Box in Boston.

Popularity

Polls
 1942: Billboard's "Collegiate Choice of Female Vocalists," Duke received votes for first and second choice.
 April 12, 1942: A swing magazine presented Marilyn Duke with an award during Vaughn Monroe's final performance, after a long engagement, at the Commodore Hotel in New York
 The February 1942 issue of Big Song Magazine, Vol. 2, No. 2, Vaughn Monroe, Marilyn Duke, and Sammy Kaye were on the cover.
 In January 1945, Duke's rendition of "The Trolley Song," became a top-ten hit.  That song, and the one on the flip side, "The Very Thought of You," were recorded Sunday, November 12, 1944, at Victor's studio in New York, 18 hours after the 27-month Petrillo Ban had been lifted.  The session represented Victor's first since the ban.  Both songs were pressed and on sale only 24 hours later. Victor Victor distributed 160,000 copies throughout the country before the week was out.

{|width="100%" border="0" cellpadding="0" style="border:0px solid #A3B1BF;  color: black; background-color:white;"

|-  style="vertical-align:bottom; text-align:center;"
| colspan=7 style="background:#cef2e0; border:1px solid #a3bfb1 border-radius: 12px 12px 0px 0px;" | Billboard

|-  style="vertical-align:bottom; text-align:center;"
| style="background:#cef2e0;"| WeekEnding
| style="color:black; background:#cef2e0;"| Reviewed
| style="color:black; background:#cef2e0;"| RecordSales
| style="color:black; background:#cef2e0;"| JukeBox
| style="color:black; background:#cef2e0;"| RadioPlugs
| style="color:black; background:#cef2e0;"| BBIssue
| style="color:black; background:#cef2e0;"| Page(s)

|-  style="vertical-align:bottom; text-align:center;"
| colspan=7 style="color: black; background:#ddd" | "There'll Be Some Changes Made"|-  style="vertical-align:bottom; text-align:center;"
| style="color:black; background:#f5fffa;"| 1941
| style="color:black; background:#f5fffa;"| Daniel Richman
| style="color:black; background:#f5fffa;"| 
| style="color:black; background:#f5fffa;"| 
| style="color:black; background:#f5fffa;"| 
| style="color:black; background:#f5fffa;"| February 15, 1941
| style="color:black; background:#f5fffa;"| 13

|-  style="vertical-align:bottom; text-align:center;"
| colspan=7 style="color: black; background:#ddd; border-radius: 0px 0px 0px 0px;" | "The Trolley Song"

|-  style="vertical-align:bottom; text-align:center;"
| style="color:black; background:#f5fffa;"| December 9, 1944
| style="color:black; background:#f5fffa;"| Maurie Orodenker
| style="color:black; background:#f5fffa;"| 
| style="color:black; background:#f5fffa;"| 
| style="color:black; background:#f5fffa;"| 
| style="color:black; background:#f5fffa;"| December 9, 1944
| style="color:black; background:#f5fffa;"| 21

|-  style="vertical-align:bottom; text-align:center;"
| style="color:black; background:#eaeef2;"| December 7, 1944
| style="color:black; background:#eaeef2;"| 
| style="color:black; background:#eaeef2;"| 
| style="color:black; background:#eaeef2;"| 15
| style="color:black; background:#eaeef2;"| 
| style="color:black; background:#eaeef2;"| December 16, 1944
| style="color:black; background:#eaeef2;"| 19

|-  style="vertical-align:bottom; text-align:center;"
| style="color:black; background:#f5fffa;"| December 14, 1944
| style="color:black; background:#f5fffa;"| 
| style="color:black; background:#f5fffa;"| 
| style="color:black; background:#f5fffa;"| 10
| style="color:black; background:#f5fffa;"| 
| style="color:black; background:#f5fffa;"| December 23, 1944
| style="color:black; background:#f5fffa;"| 19

|-  style="vertical-align:bottom; text-align:center;"
| style="color:black; background:#eaeef2;"| December 21, 1944
| style="color:black; background:#eaeef2;"|
| style="color:black; background:#eaeef2;"| 8
| style="color:black; background:#eaeef2;"| 9
| style="color:black; background:#eaeef2;"| 
| style="color:black; background:#eaeef2;"| December 30, 1944
| style="color:black; background:#eaeef2;"| 12

|-  style="vertical-align:bottom; text-align:center;"
| style="color:black; background:#f5fffa;"| December 28, 1944
| style="color:black; background:#f5fffa;"|
| style="color:black; background:#f5fffa;"| 4
| style="color:black; background:#f5fffa;"| 14
| style="color:black; background:#f5fffa;"| 
| style="color:black; background:#f5fffa;"| January 6, 1945
| style="color:black; background:#f5fffa;"| 20–21

|-  style="vertical-align:bottom; text-align:center;"
| style="color:black; background:#eaeef2;"| January 4, 1945
| style="color:black; background:#eaeef2;"|
| style="color:black; background:#eaeef2;"| 4
| style="color:black; background:#eaeef2;"| 12
| style="color:black; background:#eaeef2;"| 
| style="color:black; background:#eaeef2;"| January 13, 1945
| style="color:black; background:#eaeef2;"| 18–19

|-  style="vertical-align:bottom; text-align:center;"
| style="color:black; background:#f5fffa;"| January 11, 1945
| style="color:black; background:#f5fffa;"|
| style="color:black; background:#f5fffa;"| 
| style="color:black; background:#f5fffa;"| 12
| style="color:black; background:#f5fffa;"| 
| style="color:black; background:#f5fffa;"| January 20, 1945
| style="color:black; background:#f5fffa;"| 18–19

|-  style="vertical-align:bottom; text-align:center;"
| style="color:black; background:#eaeef2;"| January 18, 1945
| style="color:black; background:#eaeef2;"|
| style="color:black; background:#eaeef2;"| 
| style="color:black; background:#eaeef2;"| 
| style="color:black; background:#eaeef2;"| 7
| style="color:black; background:#eaeef2;"| January 27, 1945
| style="color:black; background:#eaeef2;"| 16

|-  style="vertical-align:bottom; text-align:center;"
| colspan=7 style="background:#cedff2;" | Cashbox — "Disk-Hits Box Score" (weekly)|-  style="vertical-align:bottom; text-align:center;"
| style="color:black; background:#cedff2;"| WeekEnding| style="color:black; background:#cedff2;"| Weekly SinglesRatings| colspan=3 style="color: black; background:#cedff2" | Artist(s)| colspan=2 style="color: black; background:#cedff2" | Disc(s)|-  style="text-align:center;"
| style="color: black; background:#EEF8FC" | December 11, 1944
| style="color: black; background:#EEF8FC" | 1
| colspan=3 style="color: black; background:#EEF8FC" | Pied PipersVaughn Monroe| colspan=2 style="color: black; background:#EEF8FC" | Capitol 168Victor 20-1605|-  style="text-align:center;"
| style="color: black; background:#EAEEF2" | December 18, 1944
| style="color: black; background:#EAEEF2" | 1
| colspan=3 style="color: black; background:#EAEEF2" | Pied PipersJudy GarlandVaughn Monroe| colspan=2 style="color: black; background:#EAEEF2" | Capitol 168Decca 23361Victor 20-1605|-  style="text-align:center;"
| style="color: black; background:#EEF8FC" | December 25, 1944
| style="color: black; background:#EEF8FC" | 2
| colspan=3 style="color: black; background:#EEF8FC" | Pied PipersJudy GarlandVaughn Monroe| colspan=2 style="color: black; background:#EEF8FC" | Capitol 168Decca 23361Victor 20-1605|-  style="text-align:center;"
| style="color: black; background:#EAEEF2" | January 1, 1945
| style="color: black; background:#EAEEF2" | 2
| colspan=3 style="color: black; background:#EAEEF2" | Pied PipersVaughn MonroeJudy Garland| colspan=2 style="color: black; background:#EAEEF2" | Capitol 168Victor 20-1605Decca 23361|-  style="text-align:center;"
| style="color: black; background:#EEF8FC" | January 8, 1945
| style="color: black; background:#EEF8FC" | 2
| colspan=3 style="color: black; background:#EEF8FC" | Pied PipersVaughn MonroeJudy Garland| colspan=2 style="color: black; background:#EEF8FC" | Capitol 168Victor 20-1605Decca 23361|-  style="text-align:center;"
| style="color: black; background:#EAEEF2" | January 15, 1945
| style="color: black; background:#EAEEF2" | 4
| colspan=3 style="color: black; background:#EAEEF2" | Vaughn MonroePied PipersJudy Garland| colspan=2 style="color: black; background:#EAEEF2" | Victor 20-1605Capitol 168Decca 23361|-  style="text-align:center;"
| style="color: black; background:#EEF8FC" | January 22, 1945
| style="color: black; background:#EEF8FC" | 5
| colspan=3 style="color: black; background:#EEF8FC" | Vaughn MonroePied PipersJudy Garland| colspan=2 style="color: black; background:#EEF8FC" | Victor 20-1605Capitol 168Decca 23361|-  style="text-align:center;"
| style="color: black; background:#EAEEF2; border-radius: 0px 0px 0px 0px;" | January 29, 1945
| style="color: black; background:#EAEEF2" | 7
| colspan=3 style="color: black; background:#EAEEF2" | Vaughn MonroePied PipersJudy Garland| colspan=2 style="color: black; background:#EAEEF2" | Victor 20-1605Capitol 168Decca 23361|-  style="text-align:center;"
| style="color: black; background:#EEF8FC" | February 5, 1945
| style="color: black; background:#EEF8FC" | 8
| colspan=3 style="color: black; background:#EEF8FC" | Vaughn MonroePied PipersJudy Garland| colspan=2 style="color: black; background:#EEF8FC" | Victor 20-1605Capitol 168Decca 23361|-  style="text-align:center;"
| style="color: black; background:#EAEEF2; border-radius: 0px 0px 0px 0px;" | February 16, 1945
| style="color: black; background:#EAEEF2" | 16
| colspan=3 style="color: black; background:#EAEEF2" | Vaughn MonroePied PipersJudy Garland| colspan=2 style="color: black; background:#EAEEF2" | Victor 20-1605Capitol 168Decca 23361|-  style="vertical-align:bottom; text-align:center;"
| colspan=7 style="color: black; background:#ddd; border-radius: 0px 0px 0px 0px;" | "The Very Thought of You"|-  style="vertical-align:bottom; text-align:center;"
| colspan=7 style="background:#cedff2;" | Cashbox — "Disc-Hits Box Score" (weekly)|-  style="vertical-align:bottom; text-align:center;"
| style="color:black; background:#cedff2;"| WeekEnding| style="color:black; background:#cedff2;"| Weekly SinglesRatings| colspan=3 style="color: black; background:#cedff2" | Artist(s)| colspan=2 style="color: black; background:#cedff2" | Disc(s)|-  style="text-align:center;"
| style="color: black; background:#EEF8FC" | December 25, 1944
| style="color: black; background:#EEF8FC" | 14
| colspan=3 style="color: black; background:#EEF8FC" | Ray NobleVaughn Monroe| colspan=2 style="color: black; background:#EEF8FC" | Columbia 36546Victor 20-1605|-  style="text-align:center;"
| style="color: black; background:#EAEEF2" | January 1, 1945
| style="color: black; background:#EAEEF2" | 10
| colspan=3 style="color: black; background:#EAEEF2" | Ray NobleVaughn Monroe| colspan=2 style="color: black; background:#EAEEF2" | Columbia 36546Victor 20-1605|-  style="text-align:center;"
| style="color: black; background:#EEF8FC; border-radius: 0px 0px 0px 12px;" | January 8, 1945
| style="color: black; background:#EEF8FC" | 16
| colspan=3 style="color: black; background:#EEF8FC" | Ray NobleVaughn Monroe| colspan=2 style="color: black; background:#EEF8FC; border-radius: 0px 0px 12px 0px;" | Columbia 36546Victor 20-1605'''

|}

 Selected discography 

Jolly Coburn and His Orchestra

Wally Bishop (pseudonym of Jolly Coburn) and His Band

Vaughn Monroe and His Orchestra on Bluebird

Vaughn Monroe and His Orchestra on Victor

Bluebird Records is a sub-label of RCA Victor. During the WWII years (and the recording ban), Victor reissued hundreds of jazz records from its Bluebird library. After World War II, the Bluebird label was retired and its artists were re-issued on the RCA Victor label.

 Selected radio transcriptions 

 Selected live performances 
 April 14, 1943: Coca-Cola Victory Parade of Spotlight Bands (over 168 stations on the Blue Network), broadcast from MacArthur Stadium, Syracuse; Duke and Dick Shanahan (drummer) were featured guests with Will Osborne and His Hollywood Band.

 Selected compositions 

 Family 
 Parents
Manfrey Lecta Duke was born to William Franklin Duke, Jr. (1874–1940), and Gussie Mae Vaughn (maiden; 1895–1961) — William Duke's second of two wives.  Gussie, after the death of William Franklin Vaughn, married John Richardson.  Manfrey Duke had 2 brothers and 1 sister.  She also had 2 half-sisters and 1 half-brother from her father's first marriage to Margaret L ("Maggie") Scarbrough (maiden; 1874–1910).

 Husbands
 Peter O'Brien
 Sometime around the fall of 1944, Marylin Duke married Peter O'Brien, who – according to a syndicated press announcement of their marriage – was a Boston amusement park magnate. They adopted two sons, Michael and Patrick.  Their marriage ended in divorce.

 Benjamin Cushing Bowker
 Marylin Duke was known as Manfred L. Bowker when she died August 7, 1995, in Clayton County, Georgia.  She had been residing in Fayetteville, Fayette County, Georgia. She was the widow of Benjamin Cushing Bowker (1912–1968), a native of Quincy, Massachusetts, who died in an auto accident in Jackson County, Georgia.  At the time of his death, they were residents of Dorchester, Massachusetts. Bowker was a 1933 alumnus of Harvard and 1934 alumnus of Boston Teachers College; early in his career, Bowker had been a journalist from Boston.  He later worked in corporate public relations.  Darren Bowker (born 1974), a grandson of Benjamin Bowker and Joan C. Valentas (1913–1979), Benjamin's first wife, is a winemaker with Serenity Vineyards in Penn Yan, in the Finger Lakes region of New York.

 Death
Duke suffered a stroke in 1990 and was treated at Grady Memorial Hospital, Atlanta.  Her maternal 1st cousin, Marilyn Jean Howell (née Vaughn), cared for her until her death August 7, 1995.  Duke is buried in Crest Lawn Memorial Park, Atlanta, in the family plot of her maternal Aunt Clara Belle Tarrant (née Vaughn; 1899–1982)

 Images 
 Marilyn Duke and Matty Principal at the Moulin Rouge Hotel, Las Vegas, June 5, 1955 (12 days after the hotel's official grand opening)
 Original source: Nevada State Museum, Las Vegas, Jay Florian Mitchell (1900–1984) Photo Collection
 Collection: The African American Experience in Las Vegas, UNLV Libraries

 Monroe personnel who worked with Duke 
 Four V's (aka Four Vees), male quartet culled from the band
 1942-194?: Four Lee Sisters (formerly known as Le Ahn Sisters), Jean, Miriam, Virginia, and Maree:

 1942–194?: Ziggy Talent (1912–1997)

 Miscellaneous 
 Vaughn Monroe became the host for a radio show sponsored by Camel Cigarettes.  Beginning July 1942, Monroe and his Orchestra aired 30 minutes, Monday's, at 8:30, Eastern time, on CBS Radio from the Rhodes Ballroom, Providence, Rhode Island.  According to Marilyn Jean Howell (née Vaughn) — Marilyn Duke's maternal 1st cousin who cared for her during the last five years of her life – Duke was a chain smoker of Camel Cigarettes.

 References 

General notes and resources

 Yahoo discussion group
 Daniel C. Gabel (born 1988) is a trombonist and founder/leader of The Abletones (a big band specializing in 1930s and 1940s music). He is a jazz history scholar, particularly the big band era. He holds two bachelor's degrees from UMass (Political Science and, from the UMass Commonwealth Honors College, Jazz History).  In 2014, he earned a master's degree from the New England Conservatory of Music; his thesis was on Vaughn Monroe; he is the president and CEO of The American Big Band Preservation Society, Inc., a Massachusetts 501(c)(3) tax-exempt charity; as of 2016, in Worcester, Gabel is director of music at his alma mater (class of 2007), Holy Name Central Catholic Jr./Sr. High School and director of jazz programs, Worcester Youth Orchestras
 The Online Discographical Project,'' Camron Shane Settlemier (domain registrant), Albany, Oregon
 "Bluebird numerical listings 11000–11500"
 "Victor 20000–20500" (Victor Matrix Nos.)
 The Vaughn Monroe Collection, Special Collections, New England Conservatory Library;

Inline notes

Inline citations

Inline citations from Billboard
 (1940–2010 archived online by Google Books)

1916 births
1995 deaths
People from Jackson, Georgia
20th-century American women singers
American women jazz singers
American jazz singers
American women pop singers
Big band singers
Blues singers
Contraltos
Swing singers
Torch singers
Traditional pop music singers
Bluebird Records artists
RCA Victor artists
20th-century American singers